The 2018–19 Loyola Ramblers men's basketball team represented Loyola University Chicago during the 2018–19 NCAA Division I men's basketball season. The Ramblers, led by seventh-year head coach Porter Moser, played their home games at the Joseph J. Gentile Arena in Chicago, Illinois. They were members of the Missouri Valley Conference. They finished the season 20–14, 12–6 in MVC play to earn a share of the MVC regular season championship. As the No. 1 seed in the MVC tournament, they beat Valparaiso before losing to Bradley in the semifinals. As a regular season conference champion who did not win their tournament championship, the Ramblers received an automatic bid to the National Invitation Tournament as the No. 7 seed in the TCU bracket. There they lost in the first round to Creighton.

Previous season
The Ramblers finished the 2017–18 season 32–6, 15–3 in MVC play with a win against Evansville on February 18, 2018, Loyola clinched at least a share of its first-ever Missouri Valley Conference regular season championship. With a win over Southern Illinois on February 21, the Ramblers clinched the outright MVC championship. The Ramblers defeated Northern Iowa, Bradley, and Illinois State to win the MVC tournament. As a result, the Ramblers received the conference's automatic bid to the NCAA tournament. As the No. 11 seed in the South Region, they upset No. 6-seeded Miami (FL) on a last second three-pointer. In the Second Round, they defeated No. 3-seeded Tennessee to earn the school's first trip to the Sweet Sixteen since 1985. They then defeated Nevada in the Sweet Sixteen and Kansas State in the Elite Eight to advance to the Final Four for the first time since 1963. Their Cinderella run ended with loss to Michigan in the national semifinal.

Offseason

Departures

Incoming transfers

2018 recruiting class

2019 recruiting class

Roster

Schedule and results

|-
!colspan=9 style=|Exhibition

|-
!colspan=9 style=| Non-conference regular season

|-
!colspan=9 style=| Missouri Valley regular season

|-
!colspan=9 style=| Missouri Valley tournament

|-
!colspan=9 style=| NIT

Source

Rankings

References

Loyola
Loyola Ramblers men's basketball seasons
Loyola Ramblers men
Loyola Ramblers men
2010s in Chicago
Loyola Ramblers men
Loyola Ramblers men
Loyola